is a Japanese instructor of Shotokan karate.
 
He is currently an instructor of the Japan Karate Association.

Biography

Koji Chubachi was born in Yamagata Prefecture, Japan on 25 February 1985. He studied at Teikyo University. His karate training began when he was 7 years old.

Competition
Koji Chubachi has had considerable success in karate competitions.

Major Tournament Success
12th Funakoshi Gichin Cup World Karate-do Championship Tournament (Pattaya, 2011) - 2nd Place Kumite
13th Funakoshi Gichin Cup World Karate-do Championship Tournament (Tokyo, 2014) - 1st Place Kumite

References

 

1987 births
Japanese male karateka
Karate coaches
Shotokan practitioners
Sportspeople from Yamagata Prefecture
Living people